Windows Essentials (formerly Windows Live Essentials and Windows Live Installer) is a discontinued suite of Microsoft freeware applications that includes email, instant messaging, photo sharing, blogging, and parental control software. Essentials programs are designed to integrate well with each other, with Microsoft Windows, and other Microsoft web-based services such as OneDrive and Outlook.com.

Applications
Windows Essentials 2012 includes the following applications: 
Photo Gallery
Movie Maker
Mail
Writer
OneDrive (later integrated into Windows 8.1 or Windows 10)
Family Safety (Windows 7 only)
Messenger

Windows Essentials applications support installation on Windows 10, Windows 7, Windows 8, Windows 8.1, Windows Server 2008 R2, Windows Server 2012 and Windows Server 2012 R2. Previous versions were also available on Windows XP and Windows Vista, and included Windows Live Messenger.

History

Windows Live Dashboard
On August 25, 2006, Microsoft began seeking testers for their invitation-only Windows Live service named Windows Live Essentials. It was very similar to Google Pack in that it allows users to discover, install, and maintain a number of Windows Live application programs. However, the original Windows Live Essentials was referred to as the website serving the purpose of allowing users to discover new Windows Live services. The Windows Live Essentials website was integrated tightly with Windows Live Dashboard, an application which offers a view of the services the user already has and what new Windows Live software and services are available. Windows Live Dashboard required users to sign-in with their Windows Live ID to check whether the service has been downloaded or not. At that time, web-based services such as Windows Live Hotmail (then Windows Live Mail) was also part of the list.

Shortly after its initial beta release, the original Windows Live Essentials website became unavailable and the website was redirected to Windows Live Betas (then Windows Live Ideas), and as a result Windows Live Dashboard also became unavailable.

Windows Live Installer (Wave 2)
Subsequent reappearance of a Windows Live Dashboard is seen with the initial "Windows Live Wave 2" unified installers from Windows Live Messenger 8.5, Mail and Writer that was released on May 30, 2007. In the "Windows Live Wave 2" suite of services, Windows Live Installer was the name of the website and software given to serve the purposes of allowing users to discover, download and install Windows Live software and services. Users were able to select the Windows Live software they wished to install on the website, and the website would pass on the information to the unified installer software such that the installer will only download and install those applications selected.

Windows Live Essentials 2009 (Wave 3)
The Windows Live Installer application was significantly updated with the subsequent "Windows Live Wave 3" release of applications, with the new inclusion of Windows Live Movie Maker (beta) and Microsoft Office Outlook Connector to its suite of products. On October 29, 2008, it was announced at the Professional Developers Conference 2008 that Windows Live Installer would be renamed as Windows Live Essentials, and would be integrated into Windows 7 to allow users to download the included Windows Live applications. However, the Windows Live Essentials applications will not be "bundled" with the Windows 7 operating system. This should allow more frequent updates to the Windows Live Essentials applications outside of major operating system releases.

On December 15, 2008, the "beta refresh" versions of Windows Live Essentials applications were released. This release included many changes since the previous beta release based on user feedback. A significant visual change in this release was the introduction of new application icons which added a common design theme to all the Live Essentials applications. The words "beta" were removed from most of the build numbers. On January 7, 2009, the "beta refresh" versions were released as the final versions, with the notable exception of Windows Live Movie Maker.

Microsoft updated Windows Live Essentials Wave 3 on February 13, 2009 and again on August 19, 2009, when Windows Live Movie Maker was released out of beta and significantly updated with additional features since the beta version released in December 2008. The final build number was 14.0.8117.0416.

After the release of Windows Live Essentials 2011, which dropped support for Windows XP, Windows Live Essentials 2009 was renamed to Windows Live Essentials for Windows XP and was made available for Windows XP users to help maintain the product user base.

Windows Live Essentials 2011 (Wave 4)

Microsoft released a public beta for the next major update for Windows Live Essentials dubbed "Wave 4" on June 24, 2010. The updated applications include Windows Live Messenger, Mail, Photo Gallery, Movie Maker, Writer, Family Safety, Mesh, and Messenger Companion. For Windows Live Mesh, the application has been rewritten to be based on the previous Live Mesh and will allow PC and Mac users to keep their documents, pictures and music in sync across multiple computers. It was also announced that Windows Live Toolbar will be discontinued and replaced by the Bing Bar. In addition, the ribbon user interface was incorporated into Mail, Movie Maker, Photo Gallery, and Writer. The Wave 4 beta has dropped support for Windows XP; Windows Vista or Windows 7 is required for its use. The beta refresh of Windows Live Essentials 2011 was released on August 17, 2010. Microsoft released the final version of Windows Live Essentials 2011 on September 30, 2010. The applications were updated with a hotfix/QFE (except for Mesh and Family Safety) on December 1, 2010, and that update became available through Windows Update from March 20, 2011. On May 2, 2012, Microsoft announced the re-branding of Windows Live. Although all applications in Windows Live Essentials 2011 suite will continue to function on Windows Vista, 7, and 8, there will be no significant updates made to these applications in the future. In June 2014, Microsoft announced that Windows Live Essentials 2011 would no longer be available for download on Windows Vista.

Windows Essentials 2012 (Wave 5)
Microsoft released Windows Essentials 2012 on August 7, 2012, for Windows 7 and Windows 8 users. Windows Essentials 2012 included SkyDrive for Windows (later renamed OneDrive), and dropped Windows Live Mesh, Messenger Companion and Bing Bar. Microsoft Family Safety is also installed for Windows 7 users only, as Windows 8 has built-in family safety functionalities. Further, Windows Essentials 2012 also dropped the "Windows Live" branding from the installer itself, as well as from programs such as Photo Gallery and Movie Maker, which have been branded Windows Photo Gallery and Windows Movie Maker respectively. These two programs have also received several updates and enhancements since their 2011 release, including video stabilization, waveform visualizations, new narration tracks, audio emphasizing, default save as H.264 format, and enhanced text effects for Movie Maker; as well as AutoCollage integration and addition of Vimeo as a publishing partner for Photo Gallery. No significant changes or re-branding were made in this release for other programs such as Windows Live Messenger, Windows Live Mail, and Windows Live Writer. It is still possible today to download the original pack for Windows Essentials 2012. Such links are provided in the form of links to the Wayback Machine.

Deprecation
Some of the apps included in the package are unsupported on Windows 8.1 and 10 and are removed after an upgrade. The Facebook integration in Photo Gallery and Movie Maker broke due to Facebook API changes. Microsoft turned off Windows Live Messenger's service and redirected users to Skype, another one of its messaging services; the installer has not been updated to reflect this change. Windows Live Mail no longer works with Outlook.com using the proprietary DeltaSync protocol due to removal of support for the latter from Outlook.com, but can be configured to use such accounts using either IMAP or POP3 protocols. Windows Live Writer no longer works with Blogger due to Blogger's authentication API changes. The suite had otherwise not received a major upgrade since 2012, and it had not received any updates through Windows Update since 2014, although Microsoft offered a downloadable buggy update in December 2015. Microsoft announced that the suite would be officially retired on January 10, 2017, and would no longer be available for download, and that after the end of support date applications already installed would continue to work but with "an increased security risk associated with use of unsupported products past their end of support date."

References

Further reading

External links

Download for Windows Live Essentials 2012

Essentials
Windows-only freeware
2006 software
Discontinued Microsoft software
Products and services discontinued in 2017